Euthalia kanda  is a butterfly of the family Nymphalidae (Limenitidinae). It is found in the Indomalayan realm.<ref>[http://ftp.funet.fi/pub/sci/bio/life/insecta/lepidoptera/ditrysia/papilionoidea/nymphalidae/limenitidinae/euthalia/ " Euthalia  " Hübner, [1819"] at Markku Savela's Lepidoptera and Some Other Life Forms</ref>

SubspeciesE. k. kanda BorneoE. k. elicius de Nicéville, 1890 Burma, ThailandE. k. marana Corbet, 1937 Peninsular Malaya, Langkawi IslandE. k. atys Fruhstorfer, 1906  SumatraE. k. mitschkei'' Lathy, 1913  Nias

References

Butterflies described in 1859
kanda